Cam Polson (born 20 September 1989) is a Canadian professional rugby union player. He plays as a second row for the Seattle Seawolves in Major League Rugby and previously for Canada internationally.

References

External links 
 ESPN Profile

1989 births
Living people
BC Bears players
Canada international rugby union players
Canadian expatriate rugby union players
Canadian expatriate sportspeople in the United States
Expatriate rugby union players in the United States
Royal Military College of Canada alumni
Seattle Seawolves players
Sportspeople from London, Ontario
University of Victoria alumni
Rugby union locks
Rugby union flankers